These are the results of the women's individual all-around competition, one of six events for female competitors in artistic gymnastics at the 1996 Summer Olympics in Atlanta. The qualification and final rounds took place on July 21, 23 and 25th at the Georgia Dome.

Results

Qualification

Seventy-four gymnasts competed in the all-around during the compulsory and optional rounds on July 21 and 23.  The thirty-six highest scoring gymnasts advanced to the final on July 25.  Each country was limited to three competitors in the final.

Final

Remaining placings

References

External links
Official Olympic Report
www.gymnasticsresults.com

Women's Individual All-Around
1996 in women's gymnastics
Women's events at the 1996 Summer Olympics